Tiozzo is a surname. Notable people with the surname include:

Christophe Tiozzo (born 1963), French boxer
Fabrice Tiozzo (born 1969), French boxer, brother of Christophe
Leonardo Tiozzo (born 1994), Italian dressage rider
Lucio Tiozzo (born 1956), Italian politician

See also
Tozzo